Polish Roma may refer to:

Polska Roma
Romani people in Poland